Saint-Eugène is a municipality in the Centre-du-Québec region of Quebec. The population as of the Canada 2011 Census was 1,131.

Demographics

Population
Population trend:

Language
Mother tongue language (2006)

See also
List of municipalities in Quebec

References 

Municipalities in Quebec
Incorporated places in Centre-du-Québec